is a 26-episode anime television series created by Tatsuya Ono and Sumio Takahashi and aired on the NET Network from 1975-10-06 to 1976-03-29 in Japan. It has since been then translated and broadcast in several languages worldwide. The story follows the young boy Pepero as he searches for his father who has gone missing while seeking the mythical golden city of El Dorado.

Plot

The story starts with Pepero, a young boy in a small poor village in the Andes who lives with his mother in their small house in the village. Pepero's father had left the village earlier in search of the mythical El Dorado, a city that is said to be built completely out of gold which no one has ever found. Pepero's father's aim is to put his family and village out of poverty. However, the father is away for a very long time and no one heard anything about him since he left. The story starts with Pepero seeing the reflection of a golden condor in a river when he was filling some pots with water. Pepero considers that a sign that his father is alive and that he should look for him. His mind is made up when he meets two weary travelers, an old man named Titicaca and an amnesiac girl named Kayna, who apparently had heard of the mythical El Dorado. Pepero's mind is made up and he decides to set off on the quest for El Dorado with Titicaca and Kayna agreeing to come along with him. On the way, he picks up more friends like Aztec, a teenager who has to look after his siblings while his mother is sick and who sometimes resorts to stealing to support his family and agrees to tag along in promise of the lost treasures, and Chuchu, who is a small boy performing in a circus and who has to look after his sister. In one episode, Pepero succeeds in taming a wild white horse and the horse repays him by coming to Pepero's rescue whenever the latter whistles. Pepero also wears a unique necklace in the shape of a white horn which is the same as the one worn by his father. This helps people identify him as the son of Carlos. This fact is uncovered when Pepero meets a guy who claims that he is Carlos and who is wearing the same necklace. At the end of the episode we discover that Carlos actually saved this man and gave him his necklace.

The golden condor also makes an appearance once in a while to guide Pepero in the general direction he has to take in order to reach El Dorado. Pepero also encounters such sinister characters as a swindler who convinces people that he alone can prevent the wrath of a mountain god in return for money from the natives and a girl who tries to kill them off in a maze among others. At one point in the story and while trying to traverse a cave to the other side, Titicaca gets trapped after a cave-in and the rest of the troop have to travel without him. The gang have to use their heads in order to pass through a maze and later on to solve another puzzle in order to get the map to El Dorado. This rough map in addition to another they acquire from a jealous princess leads them to the gates of El Dorado where Pepero discovers that his father is being accused of stealing the imperial jewels. Pepero in the nick of time discovers that his father is being framed by the head of the police and ends up proving his father's innocence and exposing the cheating official. The whole gang is later taken to meet the emperor and his family and there it is that he discovers that Kayna is actually the princess and that she had lost her memory when a group of conspirators tried to kill her off. The group is still there and try to repeat their act again but Pepero finds out and saves her. An engagement ceremony is held for Pepero and Kayna and the whole gang returns to their respective homes while Pepero and his father, loaded with cash, return to their village to spread the wealth among the poor residents.

The show holds a great fascination especially for the young viewers since it has all the elements that excite such an audience like lost treasures, clues that have to be solved, maps...etc. It also presents a wide array of interesting people who the gang meet and present them with moral and ethical problems that they have to cope with while looking for their way along the Andes.

Staff
Series Director: Kazuhiko Udagawa
Episode Directors: Takashi Annō, Yasuo Hasegawa, Yoshiyuki Tomino, Kazushi Nomura, Kazuhiko Udagawa, Masaru Katō, Motosuke Takahashi
Planning: Toshitaka Yokochi, Shōichi Kitamura
Series Organization: Yoshio Umezu, Mitsuo Satō
Original Development: Tatsuya Ono, Sumio Takahashi
Teleplays:
Shigeharu Harajima (ep.1, 12, 14)
Kyōdō Oda (ep.2, 19)
Naoko Miyake (ep.3, 5)
Yū Yamamoto (ep.4, 6, 15)
Masaki Tsuji (ep.7, 10-11, 16, 21)
Shun'ichi Yukimuro (ep.8, 13, 23)
Sōji Yoshikawa (ep.9)
Tadashi Minagai (ep.12, 14-15)
Izumi Arima (ep.17, 22, 25)
Yūji Mino (ep.18, 20, 26)
Keiji Kubota (ep.24)
Music: Takeo Yamashita
Character Designs: Nobuhiro Okasako, Moriyasu Taniguchi
Animation Director: Nobuhiro Okasako
Production: Wako Pro

Sources:

Cast
Pepero: Hiroko Suzuki
Anita: Mariko Taki
Aztec: Mie Azuma
Carlos: Nobuo Tanaka
Chutchu: Rie Miura
Titicaca: Toshiya Ueda
Kayna: Yoshiko Matsuo
Narrator: Wakako Ikeda (ep.1-5)
Narrator: Mariko Taki (ep.6-26)

Sources:

Media
The Adventures of Pepero EP Kaze yo Tsutaete, SCS-273, Nihon Columbia Records, October 1975
DVD box set, 2004-02-27, Dream Eggs, 8 discs

References

1975 anime television series debuts
Adventure anime and manga